Martyn is a given name which may refer to:

Martyn (musician) (born 1975), Dutch DJ
Martyn Bennett (1971 – 2005), Scottish musician 
Martyn Brabbins (born 1959), British conductor
Martyn Buchwald (1942 – 2018), birth name of American singer-songwriter Marty Balin
Martyn P. Casey (born 1960), English-born Australian bass guitarist
Martyn Finlay (1912 – 1999), New Zealand politician
Martyn Gough (chaplain) (born 1966), British military chaplain 
Martyn Green (1899 – 1975), English actor and singer
Martyn Jacques (born 1959), English musician, front man of The Tiger Lillies
Martyn Joseph (born 1960), Welsh singer-songwriter
Sir Martyn Lewis (born 1945), Welsh TV presenter and journalist
Martyn Lewis (badminton) (born 1982), Welsh badminton player 
Martyn Margetson (born 1971), Welsh professional footballer
Martyn Moxon (born 1960), English cricketer
Martyn Poliakoff (born 1947), British chemist
Martyn Quick, British mathematician and professor of mathematics
Martyn Rooney (born 1987), English sprinter 
Martyn Smith (disambiguation), various people
Martyn Waghorn (born 1990), English footballer
Martyn Ware (born 1956), British musician and music producer
Martyn Williams (born 1975), Welsh international rugby union player
Martyn Woolford (born 1985), English footballer

See also
Martyn (surname)
Martin (disambiguation)
Martijn (given name), a Dutch name sometimes written as Martyn